The Hôtel-Dieu de France is one of the three leading Lebanese hospitals It is located on Alfred Naccache Boulevard in Beirut, and is the oldest active French hospital in the city.

Hôtel-Dieu, literally "hostel of God," is an archaic French term for hospital, referring to the origins of hospitals as religious institutions.

History
The origins of the Hôtel-Dieu de France date back to 1883 when an agreement between the French Government and the Jesuits gave birth to the Faculty of Medicine (FFM) in Beirut. It continued to grow until 1975, when it was severely damaged and partially destroyed during Lebanon Civil War and continued its development and expansion at the end of the conflict. In 1984 the hospital was formally assigned to the Saint Joseph University which is responsible to a direct management, remaining a property of the French Government.

1888: Creation of the Faculty of Medicine of Saint Joseph University, following an agreement signed between the French government and the Jésuites Fathers. However, the faculty lacked a hospital for practice.

1911: Under the leadership of R.P. Lucien Catin s.j. and on the initiative of the newspaper "The Times", the SPP in France, Syndicat de la Presse Parisienne  launched a subscription to build the hospital on a land purchased by the French Government.

1914-1918: World War One broke out and construction projects were immediately frozen.

1922: General Giraud laid the foundation stone and the construction started in 1923: General Weygand, his successor, inaugurated Hôtel-Dieu de France, which opened its doors and admitted its very first patient.

1965: Agreement between the Hospital and the Sisters of Saint Coeurs delegating them the task of nursing administration.

1984: The hospital remained the property of the French State but its management was transferred to the Saint-Joseph University.

2001: Inauguration of the central building which housed new hospitalization facilities and departments.

2005: Inauguration of the private clinics’ tower.

2010: Under the leadership of R.P. René Chamussy s.j., Rector of Saint-Joseph University, the hospital decided to adopt a new governance system to meet its challenges in a world of health permanently changing and growing. The HDF 2020, a ten-year project was established.

References

External links 
 Hôtel-Dieu de France official site
 Hôtel-Dieu de France official site 

Hospitals in Lebanon
Hospital buildings completed in 1923
Buildings and structures in Beirut
1883 establishments in the Ottoman Empire
Hospitals established in 1883
19th-century establishments in Ottoman Syria